François Braun, born in 1962, is a French emergency doctor and politician.

On July 4, 2022, he was appointed Minister of Health and Prevention in the Élisabeth Borne government.

Biography
François Braun chose to study medicine to become an emergency doctor and to respect the family tradition. In this regard, he said: “My grandfather and my great-grandfather were military doctors. As for my father, he was a general practitioner and chief medical officer of the fire department in the Territoire de Belfort. With each accident, day or night, he went to the field.

In the fifth year of medicine, he became an emergency physician at the regional and university hospital center of Nancy in 1984. This activity in its infancy was then not very anchored within hospitals, François Braun became over the years a pioneer in this discipline so that it is recognized as a medical specialty in its own right.

From 2010, he was head of the emergency department of the Mercy hospital of the regional hospital center of Metz-Thionville.

Previously Secretary General, he chairs the SAMU - Urgences de France union from 2014.

At the end of 2016, in collaboration with Patrick Pelloux and Pierre Carli, he spoke of the importance of training hospital staff in war medicine.

In June 2022, François Braun was charged by Emmanuel Macron with a "flash mission" on the deficiencies of the hospital in France. François Braun submits a non-final version of his report on June 30. This appointment is not unanimous in the hospital world, because of his rather liberal vision of the hospital. Among the 41 recommendations, François Braun mainly defends that access to emergencies must be regulated according to a "sorting principle" via telephone regulation or at the entrance to emergencies, to treat vital emergencies as a priority and redirect other patients to duty doctors.

In July 2022, he was appointed Minister of Health and Prevention in the Élisabeth Borne government.

References

Living people
1962 births
French Ministers of Health
21st-century French politicians
Members of the Borne government